Oreše is a village in the municipality of Čaška, North Macedonia. It used to be part of the former municipality of Bogomila. It historically has been identified as a Mijak village.

Demographics
According to the 2021 census, the village had a total of 71 inhabitants. Ethnic groups in the village include:

Macedonians 50
Others 21

References

Villages in Čaška Municipality